Datagram Delivery Protocol (DDP) is a member of the AppleTalk networking protocol suite.  Its main responsibility is for socket-to-socket delivery of datagrams over an AppleTalk network.

Note: All application-level protocols, including the infrastructure protocols NBP, RTMP and ZIP were built on top of DDP.

External links
  - AppleTalk Management Information Base II
DDP Variable Specifications

Network layer protocols